Portsmouth power station supplied electricity to Portsmouth and the surrounding area from 1894 to until 1977. The power station was built and operated by Portsmouth Corporation and started supplying electricity on 6 June 1894. It was located in St Mary Street and was redeveloped several times: including major rebuilds in 1927–29 and in 1938–1952, and expanded into a larger plot. The power station was closed in 1977; the two chimneys were demolished in 1981 and the main buildings in 1982.

History
In 1890 Portsmouth Corporation applied for a Provisional Order to generate and supply electricity to the town of Portsmouth, Hampshire. This was granted by the Board of Trade and was confirmed by Parliament through the Electric Lighting Orders (No.5 ) Act 1890 (54 & 55 Vict. c. cxc). The Portsmouth Corporation electricity undertaking constructed a pioneering power station on a site in St Mary Street (50°47'36"N 1°06'11"W).

Equipment specification
The first plant and equipment was designed and installed by Sebastian Ziani de Ferranti and comprised horizontal and vertical compound engines and an early example of a Parsons steam turbine these were coupled directly to Ferranti and Parsons dynamos. The machines were supplied by five Lancashire boilers each with an evaporative output of 5,000 lb/h (2,268 kg/h) of steam. There were also motor generators and batteries. In 1898 the electricity generating capacity was 1,386 kW. There were estimated to be 39,407 lamps of 8-candle power plus 257 public lamps. By 1914 the output capacity of the plant was 3,300 kW.

Post-war plant
Following the First World War new plant was installed to meet the growing demand for electricity. By 1923 the plant comprised:

 Coal-fired boilers generating a maximum of 120,000 lb/h (15.12 kg/s) of steam, these supplied steam to:
 Generators
 1 × 200 kW reciprocating engine
 1 × 500 kW reciprocating engine
 3 × 650 kW steam turbines
 1 × 1,000 kW steam turbine
 1 × 2,000 kW steam turbine
 1 × 4,000 kW steam turbine

These provided a total generating capacity of 9,650 kW.

Camber Dock was opened for colliers to deliver coal to the power station.

Electricity supplies were available to consumers as single phase, 50 Hz AC at 200 and 100 Volts, and 3-phase , 50 Hz AC at 240 and 415 Volts.

Low pressure plant 1927
New low pressure (LP) generating sets were commissioned in 1927–29.

 Boilers
 1 × Babcock CTM 88,000 lb/h, operating at 250 psi and 650 °F (11.09 kg/s, 17.2 bar and 343 °C)
 2 × Babcock & Wilcox CTM each 50,000 lb/h, operating at 250 psi and 650 °F (6.3 kg/s, 17.2 bar and 343 °C), the boilers supplied steam to:
 Turbo-alternators
 2 × GEC /Fraser and Chalmers 10 MW sets, operating at inlet steam conditions of 245 psi and 700 °F (16.9 bar and 371 °C).

High pressure plant 1938
High pressure (HP) plant was commissioned in stages: August 1938, September 1941, December 1948, and March 1952. It comprised:

 Boilers
 2 × Clarke Chapman marine type each 123,000 lb/h, (15.5 kg/s) 
 5 × Bennis quadsum each 165,000 lb/h, (20.8 kg/s)
 2 × Mitchell each 180,000 lb/h, (22.7 kg/s)

All the boilers worked at 625 psi and 850 °F, (43.1 bar and 454 °C).

 Turbo-alternators
 4 × British Thomson-Houston 30 MW sets, operating at inlet steam conditions of 245 psi and 700 °F (16.9 bar and 371 °C).

Cooling water for the Hick-Hargreaves condensers was abstracted from the tidal harbour. The water flowrate was 6.6 million gallons per hour (30,004 m3/h).

The turbine hall was 429 feet, by 65 feet by 48 feet tall (131 m × 19.8 m × 14.6 m), and has been claimed to contain one million bricks.

Operating data
In 1898 the maximum electricity demand was 849 kW and the undertaking sold 981.273 MWh of electricity.

The operating dating data for 1921–23 is shown in the table:

Under the terms of the Electricity (Supply) Act 1926 (16-17 Geo. 5 c. 51) the Central Electricity Board (CEB) was established in 1926. The CEB identified high efficiency ‘selected’ power station that would supply electricity most effectively; Portsmouth was designated a selected station. The CEB also constructed the national grid (1927–33) to connect power stations within a region.

Operating data for 1946
Portsmouth power station operating data, 1946

Upon nationalisation of the British electricity supply industry in 1948 under the provisions of the Electricity Act 1947 (10-11 Geo. 6 c. 54)  the Portsmouth electricity undertaking was abolished, ownership of Portsmouth power station was vested in the British Electricity Authority, and subsequently the Central Electricity Authority and the Central Electricity Generating Board (CEGB). At the same time the electricity distribution and sales responsibilities of the Portsmouth electricity undertaking were transferred to the Southern Electricity Board (SEB).

Operating data for 1954–71
Operating data for the period 1954–71 is shown in the table:

Closure
The station was disconnected from the national grid on Sunday 20 March 1977 and decommissioned. The two chimneys were demolished in 1981 and the main buildings in 1982. The area has since been redeveloped.

See also
 Timeline of the UK electricity supply industry
 List of power stations in England

References

1894 establishments in England
1977 disestablishments in England
Coal-fired power stations in England
Demolished power stations in the United Kingdom
Former coal-fired power stations in the United Kingdom
Former power stations in England
Buildings and structures in Portsmouth
Buildings and structures demolished in 1981
Buildings and structures demolished in 1982
Energy infrastructure completed in 1894